Clarke Cushing Fitts (October 17, 1870 – December 20, 1916) was a Vermont attorney and businessman who served as the state’s first Attorney General following the reestablishment of the office in 1904.

Early life
Clarke Cushing Fitts was born in Wardsboro, Vermont on October 17, 1870.  He attended Leland and Gray Seminary and graduated from Brattleboro High School in 1886.  He studied law at the Brattleboro firm of Waterman, Martin and Hitt, and was admitted to the bar in 1891, a few days after his twenty-first birthday.

Career
A Republican, Fitts served as State's Attorney of Windham County from 1894 to 1896.  In 1901 he was offered appointment to a federal judgeship in Nome, Alaska, but he declined.

In the early 1900s Fitts served on the Vermont Library Commission, including service as the commission’s Chairman.

In 1904 the Vermont General Assembly passed a bill to reestablish the office of Attorney General, which had been abolished in 1797.  Fitts, then a member of the Vermont House of Representatives and chairman of its Judiciary Committee, won the legislative election to the office.  He was reelected by popular vote in 1906, and served From October, 1904 to October, 1908.

Fitts was President of the Vermont Bar Association in 1912 and 1913, and also served as a Vice President of the American Bar Association.

In addition to his legal practice, Fitts was involved in several businesses, and was a director of the National Life Insurance Company, Connecticut River Power Company, People’s National Bank, Brattleboro Savings Bank, New England Power Company, and Hooker, Corser and Mitchell, a manufacturer of heavy duty work clothing and children’s play clothes.

Death and burial
Fitts died at the home of relatives in Watertown, Massachusetts on December 20, 1916, following an illness and unsuccessful surgery.  He was entombed in a mausoleum at Brattleboro’s Morningside Cemetery.

Family
Fitts was married twice.  In 1893 he married Harriet Lyon of Londonderry, Vermont (1868-1897).  In 1903 he married Maud Emerson (1870-1940) of Brattleboro.  With his first wife, Fitts had two sons, Robert and Stanley.  His children with his second wife included son Osmer and daughter Miriam.

References

External links

1870 births
1916 deaths
People from Wardsboro, Vermont
Vermont Attorneys General
Republican Party members of the Vermont House of Representatives
People from Brattleboro, Vermont
Vermont lawyers
State's attorneys in Vermont
Burials in Vermont
19th-century American politicians
American lawyers admitted to the practice of law by reading law
19th-century American lawyers